Mid-Autumn Festival is a Chinese harvest festival.  Other festivals which may also be known by the same English name are:
Chuseok, a Korean harvest festival
Tsukimi, a Japanese harvest festival
 Tết Trung Thu, a Vietnamese mid-autumn harvest festival